The Tarquinia Painter ( c. 470–460 BCE) was an ancient Attic vase painter working in red-figure technique during the early mid-5th century BCE. His artistic personality (for he never signed his work) has been extrapolated by John Beazley from his type-piece, Tarquinia RC 1121, Museo Nazionale Tarquiniese, illustrated in Corpus Vasorum Antiquorum II, plate 22.1.

References

External links

Kylix at the Princeton Art Museum
Work and fragments at the Getty Museum
Kylix sold by Christies

5th-century BC deaths
Ancient Greek vase painters
Anonymous artists of antiquity
People from Attica
Year of birth unknown